Mehtab Singh (d. 1745) was a Sikh warrior and martyr. He was the son of Hara Singh of Mirarikot, a Sikh of the Bhangu clan.

Sikh Persecution
Punjab had gone through an era of Sikh persecution under the Mughal governor of Lahore, Zakariya Khan, from 1726 to 1745 A.D.

In 1740, the governor of Lahore put Massa Ranghar or Musalul Khan, a Chaudhury of Mandiala, in charge of Harmandir Sahib (Golden Temple). Sikhs were not allowed to visit Harmandir Sahib or to take a dip in the holy waters of its tank (sarovar). Massa Ranghar persecuted the Sikhs and looted the shops and homes of Hindus. He watched dancing girls perform, drank alcohol and smoked shisha inside Harmandir Sahib.

News from Amritsar
Two residents of Amritsar, Tej Ram, a Hindu, and Bulaka Singh, took this news to a band of Khalsa in the deserts of Bikaner under the leadership of Sardar Sham Singh. Tej Ram and Bulaka Singh narrated their stories to the congregation of Sikhs. After listening, Sardar Mehtab Singh Bhangu volunteered to bring Massa Ranghar's head back to Bikaner. Another Sikh, Sardar Sukha Singh of Mari Kamboki also stood up and asked to accompany Mehtab Singh.

Both of the Sikhs disguised themselves as landlords (Chaudhries) bringing revenue to Amritsar. They rode across the desert and reached Damdama Sahib at Talwandi Sabo near Bathinda. They filled up bags of broken pottery pieces and made them look as if they were full of coins.

Revenge at Harmandir Sahib
On August 11, 1740 A.D. they dressed up as landlords from Patti and entered the city of Amritsar. They reached Harmandir Sahib and then tied their horses to the berry tree and went inside Harmandir Sahib carrying the bags. Massa Ranghar was smoking shisha and watching dancing girls. The Sikhs threw the bags under Massa's bed and said that they had come to pay the revenue. Massa bent downwards to have a look at the bags. Mehtab Singh immediately took his sword and slashed it at Massa's neck and instantly severed his head. Sukha Singh finished off the guards of Massa Ranghar. They put Massa's head in a bag and rode their horses back to Talwandi Sabo the same evening. The next day they reached Bikaner and presented Massa Ranghar's head on a spear to the congregation (Dal) of Sikhs.

Death

He was crushed on the spikes of wheel (charkhari) and put to death in 1745. He was martyred alongside Taru Singh, who was scalped alive.

Legacy 
Rattan Singh Bhangu, author of the Sikh historiographical text 'Prachin Panth Parkash', was his grandson.

See also
Sukha Singh
Rattan Singh Bhangu
Udham Singh
Massa Ranghar

References 

Sikh warriors